The Copa Tocantins is a tournament organized by Federação Tocantinense de Futebol in order to decide how club would be the representative of the state at Campeonato Brasileiro Série C and Copa do Brasil.

List of champions

References

Football in Tocantins